"Common Burn"/"Lay Myself Down" is a double A-sided single from alternative rock/dream pop duo Mazzy Star. Their first new material in over 15 years, the single was released by the band's own independent label Rhymes of An Hour Records digitally on October 31, 2011 and on limited edition coloured vinyl on January 24, 2012. The name of their record label is taken from the title of a song found on their last studio album, 1996's Among My Swan.

Recorded in California, London and Norway, the full version of b-side "Lay Myself Down" is available to stream in its entirety on Pitchfork in promotion for the release of the single.

Track listing

References

2011 singles
Mazzy Star songs